Kenneth, Ken or Kenny Thomas may refer to:
 Kenneth Thomas (chess player) (born 1938), Chief Financial Officer of the United States Chess Federation
 Ken Thomas (trade unionist) (1927–2008), Welsh trade unionist and General Secretary of the Civil and Public Services Association
 Ken Thomas (record producer), English record producer and recording engineer
 Ken Thomas (American football), American football running back
 Kenneth Thomas (cricketer) (born 1942), Australian cricketer
 Kenny Thomas (basketball) (born 1977), American basketball player
 Kenny Thomas (singer) (born 1968), British dance music singer
 Keni Thomas, American country music singer and motivational speaker
 Kenneth Bryn Thomas (1915–1978), English physician